Lieutenant General Timothy Paul Evans,  (born 21 September 1962) is a retired British Army officer, who served as Commandant of the Royal Military Academy Sandhurst from 2012 to 2013 and then commander of the Allied Rapid Reaction Corps from 2013 to 2016.

Early life
Evans was educated at Monkton Combe School, near Bath in Somerset.

Military career
From 5 September 1980, while studying at university, Evans was a second lieutenant (on probation) (University Cadetship). His commission was terminated on 16 October 1981. On 7 August 1982, upon graduation from the Royal Military Academy Sandhurst, he was commissioned into the Light Infantry as a second lieutenant. He was promoted to lieutenant on 7 August 1984, and to captain on 7 August 1988.

Evans passed Special Forces Selection in 1990. He served as a troop commander in 22 Special Air Service Regiment. He attended the Army Command and Staff College and was promoted to major on 30 September 1994.

Evans was promoted to lieutenant colonel on 30 June 2000 with seniority from that date, and posted to the newly opened Development, Concepts and Doctrine Centre. He was appointed Commanding Officer of 1st Battalion the Light Infantry in July 2001, after which he became chief of staff at Headquarters 3rd (UK) Division which was deployed to Southern Iraq. He was promoted to colonel on 30 June 2004 with seniority from 30 June 2004, and to brigadier on 31 December 2005 with seniority from 30 June 2005. He was then made commander of 19th Light Brigade, which was deployed to Iraq in 2006. He became Chief of Joint Force Operations at Permanent Joint Headquarters Northwood in 2008.

On 30 September 2009, Evans was promoted to major general and appointed chief of staff of the Allied Rapid Reaction Corps (ARRC). The ARRC was deployed to Afghanistan in January 2011 with Evans taking over as chief of staff at ISAF Joint Command. On 20 April 2012, he was appointed Commandant of the Royal Military Academy Sandhurst. He took over as commander of the Allied Rapid Reaction Corps in August 2013. Evans handed over his command on 25 July 2016 to Lieutenant General Tim Radford.

Evans retired from the British Army on 1 November 2016.

Honours and decorations
On 29 June 1991, the then Captain Evans was Mentioned in Despatches "in recognition of gallant and distinguished services in the Gulf".

He was appointed Member of the Order of the British Empire (MBE) in the 2001 Birthday Honours and Commander of the Order of the British Empire (CBE) on 28 September 2012, "in recognition of gallant and distinguished services in Afghanistan during the period 1 October 2011 to 31 March 2012". He was appointed Companion of the Order of the Bath (CB) in the 2016 New Year Honours.

On 9 January 2006, he was appointed to the honorary position of Deputy Colonel of The Light Infantry. He relinquished the appointment on 1 February 2007. He was appointed Deputy Colonel of The Rifles on 1 April 2008.

References

|-
 

1962 births
Graduates of the Staff College, Camberley
British Army lieutenant generals
British Army personnel of the Gulf War
British Army personnel of the Iraq War
British Army personnel of the War in Afghanistan (2001–2021)
Commanders of the Order of the British Empire
Companions of the Distinguished Service Order
Living people
People educated at Monkton Combe School
The Light Infantry officers
Companions of the Order of the Bath